Lauri Einer (born 16 October 1931 in Tartu) is an Estonian politician. He was a member of VII Riigikogu.

References

Living people
1931 births
Estonian Reform Party politicians
Members of the Riigikogu, 1992–1995
Politicians from Tartu